Jacob van Westrop (7 November 1886 – 28 June 1962) was a Dutch wrestler. He competed in the men's Greco-Roman light heavyweight at the 1908 Summer Olympics.

References

1886 births
1962 deaths
Dutch male sport wrestlers
Olympic wrestlers of the Netherlands
Wrestlers at the 1908 Summer Olympics
Sportspeople from Zaanstad